A list of films produced in France in 1946.

See also
 1946 in France

References

External links
 French films of 1946 at the Internet Movie Database
French films of 1946 at Cinema-francais.fr

1946
Films
French